Shahriar Chowdhury Emon (Bangla: শাহরিয়ার চৌধুরী ইমন) known by his stage name Salman Shah was a  Bangladeshi film and television actor. Widely regarded as one of the most influential actor in Bangladeshi film history. He was born on September 19, 1971, in Sylhet. Salman Shah made his acting debut in 1993 with the movie "Keyamat Theke Keyamat," which became an instant hit and established him as a leading actor in Bangladeshi Cinema. Over the three years of acting career, Salman Shah acted in more than 27 films, which is highest by any actor till date.

Shah began his career in 1985 by debuting in a song written by a popular tv anchor of 1980's ,Hanif Sanket. He later worked on several TV commercials. His breakthrough came with the film "Keyamat Theke Keyamat" in 1993. It was a massive success and gained him a lot of popularity in the country. He later acted on many popular films. Some of Salman Shah's most notable films include Shopner Thikana (1995), Anondo Osru (1997), Sotter Mrittu Nei (1996), Denmohor (1995). In addition to his acting career, Salman Shah was also a successful producer and director. He is also a playback singer. He worked as a playback singer in his film Prem Juddho (1994).

Although, Salman Shah's career and life were cut short when he was found dead in his apartment in Eskaton on September 6, 1996. Salman Shah made significant contributions to the Bangladeshi film industry, and his legacy continues to inspire new generations of actors and filmmakers. He remains a beloved figure in Bangladeshi popular culture, and his films continue to be watched and appreciated by audiences around the world. In recognition of his contributions to the film industry, the Bangladesh Film Development Corporation established a statue of him in FDC, Dhaka.

A popular figure during the 1990s. He known for his good looks, charming personality, and ability to portray a wide range of characters, Salman Shah quickly became a beloved figure in Bangladeshi popular culture. He was particularly popular among young people, who found his style and personality relatable and appealing. Salman Shah's performances were noted for their depth and sincerity, and he was equally adept at playing serious and comedic roles. Salman Shah was also known for his philanthropic work, particularly in the areas of education and healthcare. He established the Salman Shah Foundation to provide scholarships and financial assistance to underprivileged students, and to support healthcare initiatives in Bangladesh.

Early life and career
Shah was born as Shahriar Chowdhury Emon on 19 September 1971 in Zakiganj, Sylhet, Bangladesh to Nilufar Zaman Chowdhury and Kamaruddin Chowdhury. He had a younger brother Chowdhury Mohammad Shahran Evan.

In 1993, Shah got his break-through in the film Keyamot Theke Keyamot, directed by Sohanur Rahman Sohan. The film was a remake of an Indian film named Qayamat Se Qayamat Tak, released in 1988. He started his acting career in a television drama. He acted in a total of 27 films. His film career was associated first with actress Moushumi and then Shabnur. He acted with Moushumi in feature films Denmohor and Antore Antore.

Death

Salman Shah died 6 September 1996. He was found hanging from the ceiling of his bedroom at Eskaton, Dhaka. Police had filed a case of suicide, but the family objected to it and lodged a murder case. Business tycoon Aziz Mohammad Bhai was alleged to be involved in the murder. One Rezvi Ahmed was arrested from the house of Shah's mother, who reportedly named Bhai and Shah's wife Samira of ordering the hit. Rezvi later disowned his confession. On 24 February 2020, Police Bureau of Investigation completed their investigation and reported that Salman Shah killed himself due to family dispute over his affair with one of the most popular silver screen actresses at the time, actress Shabnur.

Shah is buried in Shah Jalal Dargah Cemetery in Sylhet.

Legacy 
Shah is often regarded as the most popular actor of his generation. On his birth anniversary the Salman Shah Smriti Parishad (Salman Shah Memorial Council) organizes a festival every year.

Filmography

Films

Television

References

External links
 

1971 births
1996 deaths
People from Zakiganj Upazila
Bangladeshi male film actors
Bangladeshi male television actors
20th-century Bangladeshi male actors
Suicides by hanging
1996 suicides
Suicides in Bangladesh